Colias eogene, the fiery clouded yellow, is a small butterfly of the family Pieridae, that is, the yellows and whites, which is found in India.

See also
List of butterflies of India
List of butterflies of India (Pieridae)

References

 
  
 
 
 

eogene
Butterflies of Asia
Butterflies described in 1865
Taxa named by Baron Cajetan von Felder